Alexander Hampden (1546–1618) was an English politician.

He was the eldest son of Michael Hampden of Hartwell House, Buckinghamshire. He succeeded his father in 1571 and was knighted in 1603 by King James I on his journey south to take the throne.

He was appointed High Sheriff of Buckinghamshire for 1591–92 and was elected Member of Parliament for Buckinghamshire in 1601.

Although married to Elizabeth he had no children. Most of his estate was left to a relative, Thomas Lee of East Claydon, Buckinghamshire.

References

1546 births
1618 deaths
English MPs 1601
High Sheriffs of Buckinghamshire
Knights Bachelor